Intersections (1985–2005) is a 4-CD and DVD retrospective boxed set by Bruce Hornsby. The tracks are a mixture of previously unreleased live recordings, unreleased studio recordings, and album cuts. The boxed set's title emphasizes the large number of musical collaborations Hornsby has embarked upon during his career, as evidenced by the list of collaborators below.

The discs are thematically broken into three categories: "Top 90 Time", "Solo Piano, Tribute Records, Country-Bluegrass, Movie Scores," and "By Request (Favorites and Best Songs)" (two CDs). A full third of the music is previously unreleased; many familiar tracks are presented as unreleased live versions rather than the original studio recordings, and the majority of the remaining tracks are from single b-sides, collaborations and/or tribute albums and movie soundtracks.

Some noteworthy collaborations include a piano-and-saxophone duet with Ornette Coleman and a performance with Roger Waters of Pink Floyd's "Comfortably Numb."  The set also offers a number of excellent examples of Hornsby's re-inventiveness with his own compositions, particularly in a live setting, for instance three different versions of “The Valley Road” are included—a live "bluesy funk" version with the Noise Makers, a Grammy-winning bluegrass version with the Nitty Gritty Dirt Band, and "a loose and sloppy but totally grooving boogie" take with the Grateful Dead.
Critics have said that Hornsby's particular integrations of different musical genres, and his passion for reinventing his own compositions, create a kind of music many might "never hear" otherwise as it is "a kind of music no one else is making."

"Song H" was a new composition that was nominated for Best Pop Instrumental at the 2007 Grammy Awards.

Track listing
All songs written by Bruce Hornsby, except where noted.
(*) denotes previously unreleased live version
(**) denotes previously unreleased track

Disc one: "Top 90 Time"'
"The Way It Is" *
"Mandolin Rain" (w/ J. Hornsby) *
"The Valley Road" (w/ J. Hornsby) * 
"Jacob's Ladder" (w/ J. Hornsby) * 
"Nobody There But Me" (w/ Haden / J. Hornsby) * 
"The End of Innocence" (w/ Henley) * 
"Look out Any Window" (w/ J. Hornsby) * 
"Across the River" (w/ J. Hornsby) * 
"Lost Soul" *
"Fields of Gray" > "That's Where It's At" (Alexander / Cooke) * 
"Walk in the Sun"
"Gonna Be Some Changes Made" *
"Dreamland"

Disc two: "Solo Piano, Tribute Records, Country-Bluegrass, Movie Songs"
"Song A"
"Song B"
"Song C"
"Song D"
"Variations on Swan Song & Song D"
"Song F"
"Song H" ** 
"Barcelona Mona"
"Backhand" (Jarrett) 
"Jack Straw" (Hunter, Weir) 
"Madman Across the Water" (Elton John, Bernie Taupin) 
"Darlin' Cory" (traditional)
"The Valley Road" (w/ J. Hornsby) – bluegrass version 
"Crown of Jewels" * 
"Big Stick"
"The Valley Road" (w/ J. Hornsby) – performed live with the Grateful Dead * 
"Hop / Skip and Jump" (Coleman) ** 
"Love Me Still" (w/ Stevens) *
"Shadowland"

Disc three: "By Request" (Favorites and Best Songs)
"The Show Goes On" * 
"Barren Ground" (w/ J. Hornsby) 
"A Night on the Town" (w/ J. Hornsby) *
"Talk of the Town" * 
"Rainbow's Cadillac"  
"Pastures of Plenty"  
"Spider Fingers" > "Tempus Fugit" (Powell) * 
"White Wheeled Limousine" > "Long Black Veil" (Dill / Wilkin) *
"King of the Hill" > "Twelve Tone Tune" (Evans) > "Mystery Train" (Parker / Phillips) *

Disc four: "By Request" Part 2
"Resting Place"
"Preacher in the Ring, Part I"
"Preacher in the Ring, Part II"
"Fortunate Son" > "Comfortably Numb" (David Gilmour, Roger Waters)" * 
"Sneaking Up on Boo Radley" *
"Shadowhand" *
"Sticks & Stones" * 
"The Chill"
"The Good Life"
"What the Hell Happened"
"Hooray for Tom"
"Candy Mountain Run" *

DVD
"The Way It Is" music video
"The Valley Road" music video
"Look out Any Window" music video 
"Defenders of the Flag" music video 
"Across the River" music video 
"Talk of the Town" music video 
"Fields of Gray" music video 
"Walk in the Sun" music video 
"Swing Street" music video 
"Go Back to Your Woods w/Robbie Robertson
"Barcelona Mona" w/Branford Marsalis
"Love Me Still" w/Chaka Khan
"The Valley Road" w/Nitty Gritty Dirt Band
"The Mighty Quinn" (Bob Dylan) w/B. B. King & Lou Reed
"They Love Each Other" (Garcia, Hunter) (as Grateful Dead)
"Comfortably Numb" (Gilmour, Waters) w/Roger Waters
"Imagine" (John Lennon)
"Another Day"
"The Tide Will Rise" w/Pat Metheny & Bonnie Raitt
"Talk of the Town" w/Gregory Hines
"Star-Spangled Banner (Key)" w/Branford Marsalis 
"Gonna Be Some Changes Made"
"Candy Mountain Run"

"Cast of Characters"
 Bruce Hornsby
 Ornette Coleman
 Shawn Colvin
 Bill Evans
 Jerry Garcia
 Grateful Dead
 Big Chief Bo Dollis
 Levon Helm
 Gregory Hines
 David Hollister
 Elton John
 Chaka Khan
 Steve Kimock
 Spike Lee
 Levi Little
 Branford Marsalis
 The Meters
 Pat Metheny
 Nitty Gritty Dirt Band
 The Noise Makers
 Bonnie Raitt
 The Range
 Robbie Robertson
 Ricky Skaggs
 Frank Vincent
 Roger Waters

Musicians
 Bruce Hornsby
 John "J. T." Thomas
 Bobby Read
 J. V. Collier
 Doug Derryberry
 Sonny Emory
 R. S. Hornsby
 George Marinelli
 John Molo
 Joe Puerta
 Jerry Garcia
 Shawn Murphy
 Laura Creamer-Dunville
 Shawn Colvin
 Jimmy Haslip
 Pat Metheny
 Levi Little
 David Hollister
 John Paris
 Robert Brookins
 Elton John
 Lloyd Jones
 Woody Green
 Ralph Payne
 Branford Marsalis
 Theodore 'Bo' Dollis
 Tim Green
 Clarence Johnson
 Reginald Houston
 Craig Klein
 Jason Marsalis
 Percy Miller
 Joshua Paxton
 Matt Perrine
 Stuart Duncan
 Mark Fain
 Kim Fleming
 Bob Bailey
 Vickie Hampton
 Clay Hess
 Jim Mills
 Ricky Skaggs
 Jeff Hanna
 Jimmy Ibbotson
 Jimmie Fadden
 Bob Carpernter
 Jerry Douglas
 Roy Huskey Jr.
 Bernie Leadon
 Mark O'Conner
 Randy Scruggs
 Terry Burell
 Rodney Denton
 John Tracy
 Mickey Hart
 Bill Kreutzmann
 Phil Lesh
 Bob Weir
 Vince Welnick
 Ornette Coleman
 Bonny Bonaparte
 John Bigham
 Jean McClain
 John D'earth
 Glen Wilson
 Bonnie Raitt
 Debbie Henry
 Matt Chamberlain
 Kyle Davis
 John Leventhal
 John Pierce 
 Michael Baker
 David Bendeth
 Steve Kimock

References

Bruce Hornsby albums
2006 compilation albums
Legacy Recordings compilation albums
2006 live albums
Music video compilation albums
Legacy Recordings live albums